McKiernan is a surname. Notable people with the surname include:

Andrew J. McKiernan (born 1970, Sydney, Australia), Australian speculative fiction writer and Illustrator
Brian Mág Tighearnán (anglicised Brian McKiernan) was chief of the McKiernan Clan of Tullyhunco, County Cavan from 1358 until 1362
Catherina McKiernan (born 1969), Irish long-distance runner
Conchobar ‘Buidhe’ Mág Tighearnán (anglicised Conor ‘The Tawny’ McKiernan) was chief of the McKiernan Clan of Tullyhunco, County Cavan from 1312 until 1314
Cú Connacht Mág Tighearnán (anglicised Constantine McKiernan) was chief of the McKiernan Clan of Tullyhunco, County Cavan from 1383 until his death in 1412
David D. McKiernan (born 1950), United States Army four-star general and Commander ISAF and USFOR-A
Dennis McKiernan (born 1932), American fantasy writer best known for The Iron Tower
Domhnall ’An Saithnech’ Mág Tighearnán (anglicised Donal McKiernan of Saitne) was chief of the McKiernan Clan of Tullyhunco, County Cavan from 1311 until 1312
Duarcán Mág Tighearnán, the Second (anglicised Durcan McKiernan) was chief of the McKiernan Clan of Tullyhunco, County Cavan from 1279 until his death in 1290
Eoin McKiernan (1915–2004), early Irish Studies scholar and founder of Irish American Cultural Institute
Fergal Mág Tighearnán the First, (anglicised Fergal McKiernan) was chief of the McKiernan Clan of Tullyhunco, County Cavan from 1362 until his death in 1383
Fergal Mág Tighearnán, the Second, (anglicised Fergal McKiernan) was chief of the McKiernan Clan of Tullyhunco, County Cavan from 1512 until his death in 1523
Fergal Mág Tighearnán, the Third, (anglicised Fergal McKiernan) was chief of the McKiernan Clan of Tullyhunco, County Cavan until his death in 1588
Gíolla Íosa Mór Mág Tighearnán (d. 1279), (anglicised ‘Big’ Gilleese McKiernan), was chief of the McKiernan Clan of Tullyhunco, County Cavan from c.1269 until his death in 1279
Íomhaor Mág Tighearnán, the Second, (anglicised Ivor McKiernan), was chief of the McKiernan Clan of Tullyhunco, County Cavan from 1258 until his death c.1269.
Jim McKiernan (1944–2018), Irish-born Australian politician
John Mág Tighearnán the First, (anglicised John McKiernan) was chief of the McKiernan Clan of Tullyhunco, County Cavan until his death in 1499
John Mág Tighearnán, the Second, (anglicised John McKiernan) was chief of the McKiernan Clan of Tullyhunco, County Cavan including the period 1641 to 1657
John S. McKiernan (1911–1997), American Democratic politician and Lieutenant Governor and Governor of Rhode Island
Kevin McKiernan (born 1944), veteran foreign correspondent and documentary filmmaker
Macraith Mág Tighearnán (d.1258), (anglicised Magrath McKiernan), was chief of the McKiernan Clan of Tullyhunco, County Cavan from c.1240 until his death in 1258.
Matha Mág Tighearnán (anglicised Matthew McKiernan) was chief of the McKiernan Clan of Tullyhunco, County Cavan from 1290 until 1311
Michael McKiernan, rugby league footballer
Sithric ‘Carrach-in-Cairn’ Mág Tighearnán (anglicised Sitric ‘the Scabbed of Carn’ McKiernan) was chief of the McKiernan Clan of Tullyhunco, County Cavan in the year 1290
Tadhg Mág Tighearnán (anglicised Teigue McKiernan) was chief of the McKiernan Clan of Tullyhunco, County Cavan until his death in 1474
Tawnia McKiernan, American television director
Tomás Mág Tighearnán (anglicised Thomas McKiernan) was chief of the McKiernan Clan of Tullyhunco, County Cavan from 1314 until his death in 1358
William Mág Tighearnán (anglicised William McKiernan) was chief of the McKiernan Clan of Tullyhunco, County Cavan from 1499 until his death in 1512

See also
 McKiernan Clan
 McKernan (surname)
 McTiernan
 McTernan
 Kiernan
 Kernan (disambiguation)
 Tiernan